My Father, the Actor (German: Mein Vater, der Schauspieler) is a 1956 West German drama film directed by Robert Siodmak and starring O.W. Fischer, Hilde Krahl and Susanne von Almassy. The film's sets were designed by the art directors Otto Erdmann and Wilhelm Vorwerg. It was shot at the Spandau Studios and on location in West Berlin. It premiered at the Marmorhaus in the city.

Cast
 O.W. Fischer as Wolfgang Ohlsen 
 Hilde Krahl as Christine Behrendt 
 Oliver Grimm as Michael 
 Susanne von Almassy as Gerda Eissler 
 Erica Beer as Olympia Renée 
 Hilde Körber as Souffleuse 
 Peter Capell as Robert Fleming 
 Siegfried Lowitz as Ruehl, Agent 
 Siegfried Schürenberg as Gustav, Intendant 
 Arno Paulsen as Herr Behmer 
 Helmuth Rudolph as Helmer 
 Lori Leux as Mady 
 Hermine Sterler as Frl. Dr. Mahlke 
 Erich Dunskus as Gastwirt vom Goethe-Eck 
 Evi Kent as Die Naive

References

Bibliography 
 Deborah Lazaroff Alpi. Robert Siodmak: A Biography, with Critical Analyses of His Films Noirs and a Filmography of All His Works. McFarland,1998.

External links 
 

1956 films
1956 drama films
German drama films
West German films
1930s German-language films
Films directed by Robert Siodmak
Films shot at Spandau Studios
1950s German films
1930s German films
German black-and-white films